Parliamentary elections were held in the Republic of Dahomey on 11 December 1960. The result was a victory for the Dahomeyan Unity Party (PDU), a merger of the Dahomeyan Democratic Rally and the Dahomey Nationalist Party, which won all 60 seats. Voter turnout was 71.0%. 

The leader of the winning party would become president. As head of the PDU list, Hubert Maga was elected.

Results

References

Dahomey
Elections in Benin
1960 in the Republic of Dahomey
National Assembly (Benin)